The 1958 Campeonato Nacional de Fútbol Profesional, was the 26th season of top-flight football in Chile. Santiago Wanderers won their first ever title.

Standings

Scores

Relegation

Topscorer

See also
1958 Copa Chile

References

External links
ANFP 
RSSSF Chile 1958

Primera División de Chile seasons
Primera
Chile